Gander Bay is a collection of communities along Route 330 in Newfoundland and Labrador, Canada. The communities include Clarke's Head, Victoria Cove and Stoneville.

Populated coastal places in Canada